

Beirut neighborhoods
City of Beirut
Badaro
Achrafieh
Beirut Central District
Hamra Street
Mazraa District
Raouché, includes Corniche Beirut

Beirut suburbs
Bourj Hammoud
Bourj el-Barajneh
Dahieh
Chyah
Haret Hreik
Shatila refugee camp

Landmark buildings and monuments
Grand Serail
Martyrs' Square, Beirut
National Museum of Beirut

Educational institutions
International College (IC)
American University of Beirut (AUB)
American University of Science and Technology (AUST)
Business and Computer University (BCU)
Beirut Arab University (BAU)
Haigazian University (HU)
Université Saint-Esprit de Kaslik (USEK) 
Université Saint-Joseph de Beyrouth (USJ)
Hariri Canadian University (HCU)
Lebanese University (LU)
Lebanese American University (LAU)
Lebanese International University (LIU)
Middle East Canadian Academy of Technology (MECAT)
 Beirut Art Studio (Painting school)

Parks
Gibran Khalil Gibran Garden
Horsh Beirut
Jesuit Garden
René Moawad Garden
Saint Nicolas Garden
Sioufi Garden

See also

.
Beirut places